Neurosymploca is a genus of moths belonging to the family Zygaenidae.

The species of this genus are found in Southern Europe and Southern Africa.

Species
Species:

Neurosymploca affinis 
Neurosymploca caffra 
Neurosymploca concinna 
Neurosymploca dukeorum 
Neurosymploca geertsemai 
Neurosymploca hottentota 
Neurosymploca kruegeri 
Neurosymploca kushaica 
Neurosymploca meterythra 
Neurosymploca namaqua 
Neurosymploca naumanniola 
Neurosymploca ocellaris 
Neurosymploca oligocenica 
Neurosymploca pagana 
Neurosymploca wallengreni 
Neurosymploca zelleri

References

Zygaenidae
Zygaenidae genera